The Journal of Family Violence is a quarterly peer-reviewed scientific journal dedicated to the study of family violence. It was established in 1986 and is published by Springer Science+Business Media. The editor-in-chief is Rebecca J. Macy (UNC School of Social Work). According to the Journal Citation Reports, the journal has a 2020 impact factor of 2.183.

References

External links

Violence journals
Domestic violence
Quarterly journals
Publications established in 1986
Springer Science+Business Media academic journals
English-language journals